In mathematics, Jacobi transform is an integral transform named after the mathematician Carl Gustav Jacob Jacobi, which uses Jacobi polynomials  as kernels of the transform 
.

The Jacobi transform of a function  is

The inverse Jacobi transform is given by

Some Jacobi transform pairs

References

Integral transforms
Mathematical physics